is a former Japanese football player.

Playing career
Miyazawa was born in Kofu on April 24, 1978. After graduating from Chuo University, he joined J1 League club FC Tokyo in 2001. Although he debuted in first season, he could hardly play in the match. In 2002, he became a regular player as defensive midfielder. However his opportunity to play decreased behind Yasuyuki Konno and Yohei Kajiyama from 2004. In 2007, he moved to J1 club Oita Trinita. However he could not play many matches. In 2008, he moved to J2 League club Vegalta Sendai on loan. However he could hardly play in the match. In 2009, he returned to Oita Trinita. However he could not play many matches and the club was relegated to J2 end of 2009 season. However the club released many regular players due to their financial problems and he became a regular player from 2010. He also became a captain from 2011. The club was promoted to J1 from 2013. In 2014, he moved to J2 club FC Gifu. He played many matches as regular player in 2014. However his opportunity to play decreased in 2015 and he retired end of 2015 season.

Club statistics

References

External links

1978 births
Living people
Chuo University alumni
Association football people from Yamanashi Prefecture
Japanese footballers
J1 League players
J2 League players
FC Tokyo players
Oita Trinita players
Vegalta Sendai players
FC Gifu players
Association football midfielders